Damjan Đoković (born 18 April 1990) is a Croatian professional footballer who plays as midfielder for Saudi Professional League club Al-Raed. He also holds a Dutch passport.

Club career
Born in Zagreb, SR Croatia, SFR Yugoslavia to a Serbian father and Croatian mother, Đoković moved to the Netherlands from Croatia at the age of three. After spending a few seasons with Dutch clubs, he moved to Slovakia and then Croatia his country of birth in 2010. Đoković joined Monza in January 2011.

Cesena
On 31 August 2011 he was signed by A.C. Cesena for €220,000.

Bologna
On 25 June 2013 he was swapped with Andrea Ingegneri of Bologna, both in co-ownership deal. for €1.4 million (Đoković) and €1.25 million (Ingegneri) respectively tag. Đoković signed a three-year contract but immediately left for Romanian club CFR Cluj in a temporary deal. In June 2014 the co-ownership deals were renewed. On 27 August 2014 he was signed by A.S. Livorno Calcio in a temporary deal. On 25 June 2015 the co-ownership deals expired. On 22 July he was released.

Gazélec Ajaccio
On 22 July 2015, after being released from Bologna, Đoković signed for newly promoted Ligue 1 club Gazélec Ajaccio on a free transfer. He became a free agent after Gazélec Ajaccio's demotion to Ligue 2 at the end of the season.

Greuther Fürth
Đoković signed with German 2. Bundesliga club Greuther Fürth on 15 October 2016 until the end of the season.

Spezia
On 28 January 2017, just six months after joining Greuther Fürth and having made seven appearances in the league, Đoković left the club for Serie B side Spezia.

Rijeka
On 19 June 2017, Đoković signed a three-year contract with HNK Rijeka in Croatia.

Return to CFR Cluj
Đoković returned to CFR Cluj on 4 September 2017.

Çaykur Rizespor
On 25 January 2021, Đoković signed for Çaykur Rizespor

Al-Raed
On 25 July 2022, Đoković joined Al-Raed on a free transfer.

Career statistics

Honours
CFR Cluj
Liga I: 2017–18, 2018–19, 2019–20, 2020–21
Supercupa României: 2018

References

External links

1990 births
Living people
Footballers from Zagreb
Croatian people of Serbian descent
Naturalised citizens of the Netherlands
Dutch people of Croatian descent
Dutch people of Serbian descent
Association football midfielders
Croatian footballers
FC Spartak Trnava players
HNK Gorica players
A.C. Monza players
A.C. Cesena players
Bologna F.C. 1909 players
CFR Cluj players
U.S. Livorno 1915 players
Gazélec Ajaccio players
SpVgg Greuther Fürth players
Spezia Calcio players
HNK Rijeka players
Çaykur Rizespor footballers
Adana Demirspor footballers
Al-Raed FC players
Slovak Super Liga players
Serie A players
Serie B players
Liga I players
Ligue 1 players
2. Bundesliga players
Süper Lig players
Saudi Professional League players
Croatian Football League players
Croatian expatriate footballers
Expatriate footballers in the Netherlands
Expatriate footballers in Slovakia
Expatriate footballers in Slovenia
Expatriate footballers in Italy
Expatriate footballers in Romania
Expatriate footballers in France
Expatriate footballers in Germany
Expatriate footballers in Turkey
Expatriate footballers in Saudi Arabia
Croatian expatriate sportspeople in the Netherlands
Croatian expatriate sportspeople in Slovakia
Croatian expatriate sportspeople in Slovenia
Croatian expatriate sportspeople in Italy
Croatian expatriate sportspeople in Romania
Croatian expatriate sportspeople in France
Croatian expatriate sportspeople in Germany
Croatian expatriate sportspeople in Turkey
Croatian expatriate sportspeople in Saudi Arabia